The following is a list of characters from Call the Midwife, a British television period-drama series shown on BBC One since 2012.

Cast

Characters

Sister Julienne
Sister Julienne, the sister-in-charge of Nonnatus House, manages both her charges and fellow sisters with a combination of tact, compassion, and no-nonsense advice. Her steadfast, compassionate guidance makes her an anchor for her colleagues, and the centre of organisation, offering comfort and help to the young midwives. She has a notably close, warm and maternal relationship with Sister Bernadette, serving as her chief mentor and confidante. Beginning with Series 4, it becomes clear that the weight of always having to be "the wise one" takes a heavier toll on her than many would guess, and she is increasingly shown leaning on Shelagh (formerly Sister Bernadette) for counsel and support; nevertheless, her faith is not shaken and she remains a serene, guiding presence for all of Nonnatus House. Her pre-order name was Louise.

In the Series 6, after her return from Africa, Sister Julienne becomes deputy sister-in-charge to Sister Ursula. Sister Ursula leaves in the third episode, and Sister Julienne becomes sister-in-charge again.

Sister Monica Joan

One of the UK's earliest registered nurses, and the last surviving founder of Nonnatus House, Sister Monica Joan (whose birth name was Antonia Keville) retired from practice prior to the events of the series. She is suffering from the early stages of dementia as well as being frail in body. Desperate to be of service and feel useful, she is given make-work tasks to keep her occupied, such as rolling bandages (which the nurses secretly unrolled beforehand). Sister Julienne expresses that it is now their privilege to care for her.

It is never entirely clear how much of Sister Monica Joan's eccentricity is due to the frailty of age, or (as Jenny and Sister Bernadette suspect) sheer willful naughtiness. She has a habit of devouring all the sweets at Nonnatus House, leading everyone to try to hide them from her. She also knits woollen teddy bears and casts her horoscope in the stars and planets in order to tell her future. It is evident that Sister Monica Joan is well-educated and well-read, as she frequently quotes a wide range of authors from Greek philosophers and Freud, to Keats and Shakespeare. She treasures her personal collection of books, even as her eyesight begins to fail.

In the final episode of Series 1, after recovering from pneumonia, she is arrested for stealing trinkets from the market: some ribbons, a handkerchief, a china robin and several other things. Later, she is suspected of stealing a ring, a bracelet and a pearl necklace, which were discovered by Jenny Lee. Sister Monica Joan then went to hide them in her knitting bag and they were found by Sister Evangelina and Sister Julienne, who called the police. Sister Monica Joan is then put on trial, and Mother Jesu Emanuel (Mother Superior of the order) testifies that Sister Monica Joan inherited those items from her mother and no crime was committed. In light of Monica Joan's age and moments of forgetfulness, she is acquitted of the trinket thefts.

In Series 2, she reconciles with her nephew and his family, fears that she is useless, spends a lot of money on taxis to see her nephew, much to the chagrin of Sister Julienne, recovers from angina, escapes a holiday with Sister Evangelina to Chichester, judges a baby show, and pays for a child's funeral. Sister Monica Joan is very close to and gets on well with Jenny. In the 2015 Christmas special, she runs away from the convent after an argument with Sister Evangelina, returning to her childhood home with the belief that everyone should go back to their home, prompted by Barbara's comment that she was not allowed back to Liverpool for Christmas. She returns just in time for their appearance on the BBC.

Beatrix "Trixie" Aylward (née Franklin)

Trixie has a much more outgoing disposition than Jenny, but the two share the sense of adventure in their work and become firm friends. Trixie loves nothing more than gossiping with her colleagues and is quite nosey when it comes to other people's business.

She occasionally comes across as a bit rude, but she means no harm by it. When it comes to her friends, she takes great pleasure in teasing them about what is going on in their lives. She is caring but no-nonsense to her patients and is encouraging at hopeless times. She is light and carefree, jokes a lot, tries to set her colleagues up with boys and is generally a little boy-mad. Nevertheless, it is clear that work is first in her life, until Curate Tom Hereward proposes to her and she accepts. But their engagement breaks down when Trixie discovers that Tom has a placement in a slum in Newcastle, an industrial city in North East England. This makes her turn even more to alcohol for comfort, but after struggling with alcoholism, with Cynthia's help, she joins a support group. She has shared a room with many of the other midwives including Jenny Lee, Patsy Mount and Valerie Dyer.

Trixie's acceptance of male homosexuality is decades ahead of her time. Prior to the events of the series, she happily served as cover for a gay medical student, providing him the appearance of propriety. Her disgust of a young father arrested in a cottaging sting was entirely the result of his infidelity; with whom he cheated was immaterial to her.

Discovering that Barbara is going out with Tom gave her quite a shock and she finds it very difficult to accept, but after a talk with Tom and Barbara she finally accepts that she can no longer hold on to Tom and must let him go. She becomes very close to Patsy, Delia, Barbara and Sister Mary Cynthia.

In January 1962, while seconded to a clinic in Africa and dozens of miles from a physician, Trixie becomes the only one of the midwives—lay or nuns—to have performed a Cesarean section. She returns to Poplar a few months later as she stays on at the clinic returning via the Mother House, when it is realised that Sister Mary Cynthia has gone missing.

Later in 1962, she meets dentist Christopher Dockerill. When a turn of events leads to them delivering a baby, they grow close. She later suspects that she is being cheated on by Dockerill, but learns that he actually has a child from a prior marriage, which he had not previously disclosed. She forgives him because he was scared to tell her, fearing he would be rejected. After a difficult situation involving a family, Trixie breaks up with Christopher expressing concern of the affect on his daughter. Trixie takes another extended leave after relapsing into alcoholism.

She returns to Poplar and continues to work with in the community, she is involved in several cases around abortion and is present when Valerie is called to her grandmother’s pub. Trixie continues to fight for Nonnatus House and the community of Poplar.
Trixie is seconded to the Lady Emily Clinic where she meets Fiona and Matthew Aylward. She assists in the birth of their son, Johnathan. However, Fiona later returns to the clinic and it is revealed she has terminal cancer and she soon dies. Matthew eventually turns out to be the owner of many properties in Poplar and offers to become a beneficiary to Nonnatus House in memory of his late wife, allowing their services to continue. Trixie and Matthew become close friends due to their shared experience with Fiona and this continues to grow.

Shelagh Turner (née Mannion)

Sister Bernadette, as she is first known, is Scottish and in her early 30s, the closest in age to Jenny and the other lay midwives. She is the most educated of the nuns and tutors the other nurses whilst providing administrative assistance to Sister Julienne, sometimes covering as her deputy. She joined the order in July 1948. A consummate professional, she has a fresh, uncomplicated approach to her work that means she connects well with Jenny and her other colleagues. In one episode, she is shown to remove her wimple, take her hair down and take off her glasses, expressing her hidden desire to be free.

In Series 2, it becomes clear that Sister Bernadette is lonely and unhappy, questioning whether the convent is her calling. She wishes to do what the other young midwives of her age are doing: going out to the cinema, dancing, and experiencing life as young women. One scene shows Sister Bernadette looking in on the midwives' room while they are drinking and gossiping, but then the door closes; it is a life that cannot be open to her while she remains a nun. In another, Sister Monica Joan points out that she spends most of her time praying for forgiveness. Sister Bernadette eventually breaks down and turns to Sister Julienne for help, confessing that what she really wants is a family and children of her own. As of the 2012 Christmas Special and from Series 2 onward, it becomes clear that Sister Bernadette has fallen in love with the local physician, Dr Turner.

After recovering from a short bout with tuberculosis, Sister Bernadette leaves the convent and reverts to her birth name of Shelagh (née Mannion). However, she still remains close to her faith, joining the Nuns at compline. She becomes engaged to Dr Turner, who has also fallen in love with her. They marry in the 2013 Christmas Special and she becomes stepmother to his 11-year-old son Timothy.  After a struggle with infertility, they adopt a baby girl called Angela.  In Series 4, it becomes clear Shelagh desperately misses nursing and midwifery, so she returns to full-time work at the surgery and maternity home, first as a medical secretary, and then also as the sister-in-charge at the surgery after Dr Turner is taken ill. She is now the medical sister-in-charge at the surgery and works alongside the other midwives and nuns at the surgery, but does not perform house calls. When at the clinic or being the acting sister-in-charge at Nonnatus House in Sister Julienne's absence, Shelagh dons smart civilian dress, rather than uniform of the order's other lay nurses, although she eventually obtained a uniform to wear when serving in a nursing capacity at Dr Turner's surgery.

Shelagh also feels guilty after thalidomide is prescribed for women in Poplar who are suffering from morning sickness. When it is linked to with birth deformities of the kind observed in recent months, she says she is as guilty as Patrick because she supported the drug being prescribed.

In Series 6, Shelagh is overcome with joy when she falls pregnant with her first biological child. However, she suffers complications and is taken ill during an inspection of the maternity home. Fearing a miscarriage, she is rushed to hospital, forcing nurses Barbara and Phyllis to take over the running of the surgery. This puts her pregnancy in jeopardy, even after being released from hospital. However, she gives birth to a son (Edward 'Teddy' Patrick Turner) with the help of Sister Julienne in the series finale.

After a year of maternity leave, Shelagh returns to Nonnatus House as senior midwife and nursing sister to cover for Barbara, who is taken ill and eventually dies.

In Series 9, Shelagh and Patrick foster then later adopt a young Chinese orphan named May Tang.

Phyllis Crane

Phyllis is a veteran nurse who also arrives at Nonnatus House in mid-1960. A neat and forthright woman, Phyllis is viewed at first as somewhat snobby; she is vegetarian and is not scared to put her ideas forward to improve Nonnatus House. She confides in Vaughan Seller, the father of a terminated baby, that she was born an illegitimate child, and confides to former street walker Roseanne Dawley that her mother too was a prostitute. In Series 5, it is seen that she has formed more of a relationship with Barbara and has taken quite a high role in Nonnatus House. Having discovered Patsy and Delia's relationship, she is supportive of heartbroken Delia when Patsy sails to Hong Kong to care for her dying father.

She is also very close to her roommate, Barbara, and serves as something of a surrogate mother figure to her much younger colleague. In the Series 6, after her return from Africa, Sister Julienne becomes deputy sister-in-charge to Sister Ursula, meaning Phyllis is demoted to Nursing Sister. When Sister Ursula leaves, Phyllis is reinstated as deputy sister–in–charge again.

Driving back from a successful delivery, Phyllis knocks over one of the family's other children with her car and is left devastated by the possible consequences. She faces suspension by the Central Midwives Board, over her actions and is told by Sister Julienne to focus on the administrative duties. However, the family ask Sergeant Noakes to drop the case.

When Shelagh is unwell and goes on maternity leave, it is expected she will take over as acting sister-in-charge of the surgery. Following Patsy's departure she took over as a leader of the local Wolf Cub Scouts.

In Series 7, Phyllis nearly dies after a fire destroys a local shop.

Frederick "Fred" Buckle

Fred is the handyman at Nonnatus House, having acted as such since the end of World War II. In the evenings, he volunteers as a scout leader and as a deputy party leader in charge of the neighbourhood Civil Defence Corps squad. He is friends with all of the midwives and often gives them help and advice, and is constantly trying to earn money with a variety of schemes that tend not to work. Fred is the father of two daughters—Dolly, who lives in Australia with her husband and their two children, Anthony and Samantha; and Marlene, who is also married and has recently moved back to England after living in Canada for several years.

Before becoming the handyman at Nonnatus, he was in the British Army, during which time his wife was killed, leaving his daughters to be shuffled around between several of his family members, causing him great pain and tempting him to desert. In Series 4, after 20 years of being a widower, Fred takes an interest in local shop owner Violet Gee; after several months of flirting during their community volunteering duties, Fred asks Violet to a charity dance. By the end of Series 4 Fred proposes to Violet—and, after dealing with his clingy daughter Marlene, he and Violet marry.

Dr Patrick Turner

Dr Turner is Poplar's local physician, as well as being the GP to all the midwives and nuns. He works closely with the midwives, helping at clinics, deliveries and at the birthing hospital and is incredibly dedicated to his patients and to his work, including fighting bureaucratic red tape to save lives with a tuberculosis x-ray screening van. He is a widower and father to Timothy and does his best to juggle the demands of being a single parent with his responsibilities as a doctor. In Series 2, it becomes apparent that he has fallen in love with Sister Bernadette, but her vows stand in the way of their relationship. After her diagnosis with tuberculosis forces her to examine what she truly wants, he makes it quietly clear to her that while the decision is hers, he is in love with her and wishes to share his life with her. She leaves the convent and chooses a different path, accepting his proposal of marriage after she has overcome her tuberculosis.

When trying to adopt, it is revealed that he suffered mental health issues after the war. Overwork and a misdiagnosis in Series 4 drives him to illness, forcing Shelagh and Patsy to take over the running of the practice. He prescribes thalidomide for women suffering from morning sickness, but when it is linked to birth deformities, he faces guilt for having prescribed the medication in the first place.

In Series 6, Dr Turner is overcome with joy when Shelagh becomes pregnant with her first biological child. However, she suffers complications and is taken ill during an inspection of the maternity home and rushed to hospital fearing a miscarriage. This puts her pregnancy in jeopardy; however, she successfully gives birth to a son (Edward 'Teddy' Turner) with the help of Sister Julienne in the series finale, with Dr Turner in the room.

Lucille Robinson (née Anderson)

Nurse Anderson arrives at Nonnatus House in Series 7 as their first black nurse. She comes from Jamaica and greatly misses her family and community. She studied nursing and midwifery for four years in England before joining Nonnatus. She often faces racial discrimination, but receives support from her fellow midwives. Nurse Anderson is religious, joining a local Black house church after finding a larger, White-majority congregation unwelcoming of her "kind". She sometimes expresses prudishness, such as when Nurse Dyer asked for her assistance with a sex education class, but she ultimately shows tolerance for the changing times and environment.

She married Cyril Robinson in the 2021 Christmas Special.

Sister Hilda

Sister Hilda is a new nun at Nonnatus House. Middle class, loquacious and good-humoured, Sister Hilda is a great facilitator in the social setting with her gregarious nature, readily putting people at ease. In haste, she can make tactless comments, but is never offensive and is quick to apologise.

An experienced midwife, she attended a girl's Catholic boarding school, and worked and lived in the East End during the Blitz in the WAAFS, but has not been back for 20 years and is surprised at the multicultural and geographical changes to the area.

Sister Frances

Sister Frances is a novice and newly qualified midwife in her early 20s. Growing up in Harrogate in a Methodist family, her parents were deeply saddened when, at a young age, Frances announced that she was joining an Anglican order, sparking a family rift. Her father is an insurance salesman/broker, affording a roomy semi-detached house for the family home.

Sister Frances attended the local grammar school and then went directly onto her Nursing/Midwifery course on leaving. Before joining Nonnatus House, she was at the Mother House working in the orphanage. She is timid and naïve, with an eagerness to please, and demonstrates a humble obedience to the Order. She is crippled by a severe lack of confidence, but grows more confident with Sister Julienne's gentle nurturing.

Anne "Nancy" Corrigan

Pupil Midwife Anne "Nancy" Corrigan is an Irish midwife in training from Cork in her early 20s and is delivered to Nonnatus House by two Catholic nuns. At the dinner table, she reveals everyone calls her "Nancy" after Nancy Sinatra, explaining she wears a lot of boots (referencing Sintra's then-popular "These Boots Are Made for Walkin'").

She is not particularly accomplished at her studies, has a tendency not to filter her thoughts, resulting in a blunt bedside manner but has a big heart. In time she learns to be more compassionate but not without occasional lapses where she puts her foot in it.  She has a distinctive bright 1960s dress sense, is funny and enthusiastic, bringing a breath of fresh air to Nonnatus, but is often a worry to Sister Julienne as she frequently fails to conform.  But in spite of concerns and misgivings from the congregation, she graduates as a Midwife and joins the district roster.  She strikes up a good relationship with Sister Frances.

It's later revealed that her 'sister' Colette, whom she visits regularly in a nearby orphanage, is actually her illegitimate daughter to whom she eventually reveals her true relationship and has ambitions to eventually reunite fully with her and find them their own home together.

Supporting characters

Timothy Turner

Timothy is the son of Patrick Turner and stepson of Shelagh Turner. He is a smart, tall child and attends the local grammar school. In 2013 Christmas special he suffers from polio, which affects his legs. He slowly recuperates and eventually fully recovers. He is seen to have an interest in medicine, and in Series 5 he helps his mother and father out more in the surgery. Timothy sets off on a crusade to make his parents give up smoking after seeing the damage it has done to their health. He is pleased when, in the following series, his stepmother gives birth to his brother. In series ten Tim leaves Poplar to go to medical school. He returns during holidays, when he helps as his father's assistant as well as assisting at clinic and as Miss Higgins' clerical assistant.

Angela Turner

Angela is the adopted daughter of Shelagh and Patrick Turner. She is first seen in the Series 3 finale and is briefly seen in Series 4 and 5 usually with Shelagh, Patrick or Timothy. She was born to a 16-year-old mother, and was put up for adoption after birth, when the Turners adopted her. It is mentioned in the series that she has a fear of squirrels.

Edward Turner

Edward ("Teddy") is the son of Shelagh and Patrick Turner, born in the final episode of Series 6.

Violet Buckle

Violet Buckle is the second wife of Fred Buckle. She owns her own haberdashery shop, called Violet Gee. She has a son who lives in Plymouth by her previous husband, Bert, who was killed in the war like Fred's deceased wife. She volunteers as a uniformed leader of the local Brownie pack as the Brown Owl of the unit.

Christopher Dockerill

Dockerill is introduced in Series 6, when Trixie escorts a female patient, who has a phobia of dentists, to see him. After carrying out work on the woman, which brings on her labour whilst in theatre, Trixie is forced to deliver the baby with his assistance. Later, Trixie believes him to be seeing another woman after he cancels a number of dates, but he tells her he has been looking after his daughter from a previous marriage.

Reggie Jackson

Introduced in Series 6, Reggie is a young man with Down syndrome. He originally lived with his mother Ivy. After Ivy dies suddenly from a heart attack, Reggie goes to live with Ivy's cousin Fred Buckle and his wife Violet.

However, realising that Reggie living with them indefinitely would be impractical, Fred and Violet decide whether the best option would be to place him in a residential facility, Glasshouse Trust, a community in the countryside for young adults with all kinds of disabilities who live and work together. Reggie continues to visit Fred and Violet.

Previous characters

Nurse Jenny Lee

Nurse Jenny Lee arrives at Nonnatus House in 1957, at the age of 22, completely unaware of the world she is about to enter. Believing she has accepted a job with a small private hospital, she is somewhat surprised to find that she has moved into a convent. Furthermore, the deprivation of the East End is a huge culture shock for the young woman who has enjoyed a privileged upbringing in the home counties and spent time in Paris before training as a nurse. However, although initially shocked by the conditions in which her patients live, Jenny comes to accept the material limitations of the world in which she works and to love the people who must live there.

She went to London to try and run away from her feelings for a married man, Gerald. Her best friend Jimmy arrives, and although he makes her feel more at ease, he also makes things more complicated by revealing that he is in love with her. She turns him down and they remain friends. She becomes good friends with her colleagues and patients, and always tries to help those around her. Toward the end of Series 2 and halfway through Series 3, she starts dating Alec, a friend of Jimmy's. Alec dies in a tragic accident and after his funeral, Jenny travels to the Nonnatans' mother house in Chichester for compassionate leave. She returns to Nonnatus House after taking time to grieve, and decides to begin working at the London Hospital in the Maternity Ward. She leaves soon after, not liking the hospital's policy of requiring impersonal relationships between nurses and their patients.

At the end of Series 3, she meets Phillip Worth (her future husband), the cousin of an expectant mother for whom she is caring and begins a relationship with him. She eventually decides to pursue a career change to care for those with terminal illnesses; she leaves Nonnatus House to work at the Marie Curie Hospital in Hampstead. It is shown in the Series 3 Christmas Special that she eventually married Phillip and started a family, and still kept in contact with the friends she made at Nonnatus House.

Camilla "Chummy" Noakes (née Fortescue-Cholmondeley-Browne) 

By the end of Series 1, after a string of dates she marries Police Constable Peter Noakes. After clinic, she swaps her nursing uniform for a scouting one, as Akela of the local Wolf Cubs whom she leads with Fred—a role later taken on by Patsy. In Series 2, Chummy applies for a place as a CMS missionary in Sierra Leone, Africa. She is accepted and she and Peter move to Africa for six months. Upon their return, Chummy reveals that she is pregnant, much to the delight of her fellow nurses. In the final episode of Series 2 Chummy goes into labour and, despite complications, she gives birth to a son, Fred. Chummy once stated that she had never been happier than when she was at Nonnatus House. In Series 4, Chummy, Peter and Freddie move to Aston Lodge mother and baby home, where Chummy is employed as the temporary, replacement matron.

Sister Evangelina

Sister Evangelina is the only one of the sisters who comes from the same tough, uncompromising background as the community they serve. Physically vigorous, she has a robust sense of humour. Her energy and drive make her extraordinarily effective at her job. However, she does not suffer fools gladly and her blunt speech and attitude often offend. She has a particularly contentious relationship with the aristocratic Sister Monica Joan, who often provokes her to breaking point. Growing up in poverty has toughened her up, making her a very comical character in the show.

Sister Evangelina knows a lot about the poverty and hardships in Poplar and often shares her insights with the young midwives. She is very close to Sister Julienne, to whom she often serves as a sounding board. In Series 3, it is revealed she has several siblings including an older brother who was killed on active service in a war and a younger brother, Vincent, who returns to her life after being absent for several years during her golden jubilee. It was seeing the birth of Vincent that inspired a young Sister Evangelina to become a nun during her formative years, a goal she achieved in 1909. In 1960 Sister Evangelina has to have an operation due to illness. Her pre-order name was Enid Atwood. In 1961, Sister Evangelina temporarily left Nonnatus House for an enclosed order. She returns in Episode 7. She announces that she had a stroke two months after she left the convent and has now lost movement in her left arm. In Episode 8, Sister Evangelina passes away following a second stroke.

Despite her gruff exterior and apparent lack of patience with others, she is deeply cherished and respected by not only her colleagues, but her Poplar community, a great many of whom she delivered—as evidenced by the masses who turned out to congratulate her on the occasion of her jubilee, and to pay their final respects two years later.

Sister Ursula

Sister Ursula arrives to replace Sister Julienne when a group of Nonnatans went to South Africa, as the new sister-in-charge, in 1962. She appears to have a strict running form when the staff return, clashing with Shelagh over the way clinic is run and the behaviour of Sister Monica Joan. Patsy and Delia appear to be keen for her to return to the mother house. She orders Sister Mary Cynthia to return to the mother house, before being informed of her assault. She returns to the mother house after she is deemed unfit to run Nonnatus House.

Sister Mary Cynthia

Nurse Cynthia Miller, like Trixie, is also a resident at Nonnatus House when Jenny arrives. She volunteers as a uniformed leader of the local Girls' Brigade.

Cynthia is the most sensitive of the young midwives, and gets very emotionally involved with some of her patients.

In Series 2, when a child dies after she delivers him, the people of Poplar suspect her of making a mistake that cost the baby its life. Cynthia begins to doubt her abilities, which takes a heavy toll on her work and health. She suffers a breakdown, but recovers with the help of Sister Julienne. An autopsy report confirms that the baby's death was due to lungs that never fully inflated. In the 2014 Christmas Special, Cynthia decides to become a postulant and leaves Nonnatus House for six months of training, promising Trixie and Patsy that she will return. In Series 4, Cynthia returns to Nonnatus House after her training is complete, having chosen the religious name of Sister Mary Cynthia. Though she now spends less time with her friends, she remains close to Trixie and ultimately convinces her to get help for her alcoholism. She is also close with Sister Winfred and Barbara.

In Series 5 Episode 6 Sister Mary Cynthia is violently attacked at the docks by a man. She thinks it is a test of faith but with the help of Sister Monica Joan, she goes to the police, and is able to return to her duties. When Sister Ursula asks about her life vows, it becomes clear that the attack is still affecting her. In Series 6, Sister Mary Cynthia is sent to the Mother House by Sister Ursula.

When Trixie returns to Poplar from South Africa, it is realised that Sister Mary Cynthia has gone missing from the Mother House. She is found in an asylum where she has been admitted as a patient, but it is apparent that she is not getting the help she needs. Dr Turner and Sister Julienne work to get her discharged into their care, and send her to a community for mental health care. She reverts to her birth name, Cynthia.

Peter Noakes

Peter is a Police Constable, and later Sergeant, in Poplar. He is first introduced in Series 1, when he is run over by Chummy on her bicycle and takes an immediate shine to her. Throughout Series 1, they go on a string of dates, eventually marrying in the series' final episode. In Series 2, he follows Chummy to Sierra Leone while she fulfills her desire to be a missionary. In the final episode of that series, he and Chummy have a baby, whom they name Fred. During his service in the Second World War, he earned the 1939–1945 Star, Defence Medal, France and Germany Star, and War Medal 1939–1945, as shown on his uniform tunic.

Patience "Patsy" Mount

Patsy is first seen in Series 2, Episode 3, as a nurse in the male surgical ward at the London Hospital. She then appears in Series 3, Episode 5 as a new midwife. She is tall elegant and favours slightly tailored clothes and becoming the first midwife to wear trousers. She has a very brisk manner but later reveals that at the age of nine that she and her mother and sister were sent to a Japanese war camp, and that she was the only one to survive of the three of them. Like Chummy before her, Patsy works with Fred as a leader of the local Wolf Cub Scouts; she recruits Delia to help teach first aid. It is then seen in Series 4 that she has a very close friendship with veteran Nurse Trixie and new Nurse Barbara. She is also quite close to Sister Mary Cynthia and Sister Winifred.

Patsy is seen to have a very close and romantic relationship with female surgical Nurse Delia Busby, with whom she had previously worked at the London. They plan to move into a flat together at the end of Series 4, but their future is shattered when Delia is involved in a cycling accident and suffers a serious head injury which results in amnesia, leaving her with no memory of Patsy. The amnesia is only temporary, however, and Patsy and Delia are reunited in Series 5 when Delia accepts an offer from Sister Julienne to live at Nonnatus House. Later in Series 5, Patsy and Delia go to the Gateways Club, a private club for lesbians. It is revealed in the Series 5 finale that Patsy and Delia are going to Paris together in spring 1962. She shares a room with Nurse Trixie, replacing Jenny Lee. Series 6 sees her temporarily leave Nonnatus House after learning her father is dying in Hong Kong. Delia is upset that she cannot go with her as support, as she is training to be a midwife. Following her father's death, Patsy seems to drop all correspondence with Delia, appearing as though she would not return to Nonnatus House, but she comes back to London on the day of Tom and Barbara's wedding.

In the Series 8 Christmas Special, Patsy and Della mail a card from Scotland to Nonnatus House.

Delia Busby

Originally from Wales, Delia is a very close friend of Patsy's, having worked together in the London Hospital's male surgical ward. She resides in the hospital's nurses home, and volunteers evenings for St John Ambulance. In her St John capacity, she works with Patsy's and Fred's scouts, principally teaching them first aid. She is revealed to be in a romantic relationship with Patsy, but together they conceal their feelings due to society's view of homosexuality at the time. At the end of Series 4, just as the two of them have found a flat to share, she is involved in a cycling accident which leaves her with amnesia, leaving Patsy heartbroken. By the following Christmas, she has regained her memories of Patsy and their relationship, and at the start of Series 5, despite continued efforts from her mother to take her home to Wales, Delia accepts Sister Julienne's invitation to board at Nonnatus House when she returns to work at the London in the coming months. By the end of Series 5, she appears to be quite close to Trixie and Barbara, and is delighted when Trixie confides in her that she attends Alcoholics Anonymous each week.

In the final episode of Series 5, Delia considers additional training as a midwife after successfully talking a young mother through her delivery over the telephone earlier in the series. Delia undertakes training in the following series.

Barbara Hereward (née Gilbert) 

Barbara Gilbert arrived in Poplar in the early 1960s, still finding her feet in district nursing and midwifery. While she was educated and middle class, she was surprisingly in tune with the needs of the community she serves, having grown up the daughter of a Canon serving in an impoverished area of Liverpool. She was hard working, optimistic, and somewhat naïve. In addition to her nursing duties, she helped teach Sunday school at the local church. In Series 5 she began a romantic relationship with Tom Hereward after they become close while working together in the parish. She was also quite close to her roommate, Nurse Phyllis Crane, who served as something of a surrogate mother figure to her much younger colleague. Tom asked her to marry him while they are out in South Africa after consulting with his former fiancée Trixie. They were married in a hurried wedding at the end of Series 6, after Barbara learned that her father has accepted a three-year missionary posting in New Guinea. In Series 7, Barbara dies after contracting meningococcal sepsis, leaving Tom, Nonnatus House and the rest of the Poplar community heartbroken and shattered.

Tom Hereward

Tom arrives in Series 3 as the new Poplar curate. He lives just across the road from Nonnatus House and is shown to have a relationship with Trixie, whom he met when the two were working the same shift in a women's prison. The two break off their relationship in Series 4. In Series 5 Tom begins seeing Nurse Barbara Gilbert. Tom asks Barbara to marry him while they are out in South Africa after consulting with his former fiancée Trixie. They are married in a hurried wedding at the end of Series 6. This is to enable Barbara's father to marry them before he takes up a three-year missionary posting in New Guinea. Tom later becomes a widower after Barbara dies from meningococcal sepsis. After her death, he travels to New Guinea to work as a missionary with his father in law.

Sister Winifred

Sister Winifred arrives at Nonnatus House at the beginning of Series 3. Sister Winifred is the same age as Jenny, Trixie and Cynthia. She finds midwifery hard. She tries twice to make a harvest loaf for the Harvest Festival, stating 'my mother made it look so easy.' She eventually succeeds on the second attempt. She seems to be close to Patsy Mount. She is now close to Sister Mary Cynthia since she joined the order and is very passionate about her work in Poplar. In Series 5 Episode 3 it is revealed that Sister Winifred is missing teaching and takes a temporary job teaching a class replacing one of her patients who was fired due to pregnancy. In Episode 4 she had returned to midwifery. In Series 6 she sets about learning to drive with Phyllis' help. She left Nonnatus house in Series 8 after finding her new calling at the motherhouse, working with the children at the orphanage.

Valerie Dyer

Valerie first appears following an explosion in Episode 2 of Series 6 coming to the aid of Shelagh following a fire in the docks. She was an Army nurse, but resigned her commission when she grew weary of the routine nature of such nursing. A native of Poplar, she took a barmaid job while sorting out her ambitions.

In Episode 4, she becomes a midwife at the Nonnatus House. Sister Monica Joan somehow recognises Valerie as having been a baby whom she delivered. Valerie faces a difficult start to the profession, delivering the baby of a woman who had experienced female genital mutilation, creating a difficult situation that ends in a hospital admission.

Previous recurring characters
 George Rainsford as James "Jimmy" Wilson (Series 1–2)
Jimmy is an old friend of Jenny's. In Series 1, Jimmy is madly in love with Jenny, even though she still pines for the married man, the reason she escaped to London. Jenny convinces Jimmy they are "just friends" and he stops pursuing her. In Series 2, the tables are turned when Jimmy returns, having graduated school and now working as a municipal surveyor/architect. Jenny sees Jimmy as a grown man for the first time which instantly turns her head, but unfortunately she discovers that Jimmy is engaged to pregnant Francine, whom Jenny met at the prenatal clinic. Jimmy and Francine marry and have a baby, Caroline.

 Dorothy Atkinson as Jane Sutton (Series 2)
Jane is the medical orderly at Nonnatus House. She arrives to fill in for Chummy while she's in Africa. Jane is very shy and does not talk unless it is necessary. We later find out the reason for her being shy—her parents sent her to an asylum when she was young, leaving her with no self-esteem. Throughout the series, she grows in confidence and makes friends with her fellow nurses. She also finds love with Reverend Applebee-Thornton (Jason Watkins), a local Anglican priest. She does not return for Series 3, with a deleted scene from the 2013 Christmas special explaining that she has gone to nursing school.

 Leo Staar as Alec Jesmond (Series 2–3)
Alec is a friend of Jimmy's who develops romantic feelings for Jenny. They eventually start dating after a long period in which Jenny continues to mourn her loss of Jimmy, but who encourages her to enjoy life and Alec. Alec and Jenny eventually date, but Jenny's abundant caution about affairs of the heart lead to a misunderstanding and argument. Castigating his co-worker in anger, Alec falls through an old staircase in the building they are renovating. In the hospital, his foot is amputated and he seems to be recovering. He later dies, thought to be because of a blood clot in his wounded leg, and his funeral is attended by a distraught Jenny and the other midwives and the nuns.

 Cheryl Campbell as Lady Browne, Chummy's mother (Series 1, Series 3)
Lady Browne is Chummy's upper-class, snobby mother. She formerly lived in Madeira before she separated from Chummy's father. When she moved to Poplar she was diagnosed with TB and Cancer. In Series 1 she was featured in the series finale before Chummy and Peter's wedding. She moved to Poplar in 1959 and was diagnosed with TB and cancer by Dr Turner. She died peacefully in Chummy and Peter's bed in the Series 3 finale.

 Maxine Evans as Mrs. Busby, Delia's mother (Series 4–5)
Mrs. Busby is the mother of Delia Busby. Her first appearance was when Delia was in hospital in the series finale of Series 4; she was also seen in the 1960 Christmas special, Series 5, Episode 1 and the series finale of Series 5. She is still not happy that Delia has decided to stay in Poplar at the convent. She also seems not to accept her decision to become a midwife and doesn't really like Patsy. It is clear that, by the end of Series 5, she is aware of Delia's and Patsy's sexual relationship and does not approve.

Notes

References

Call the Midwife
Call
Call the Midwife (franchise)